Burriscarra Abbey is a former Carmelite Priory and National Monument located in County Mayo, Ireland.

Location

Burriscarra Abbey is located 1.6 km (1 mile) west of Carnacon, on the northeast of Lough Carra.

History
Adam de Staunton, whose family later assumed the name MacEvilly (Mac Mhilidh) founded the Abbey  for the Carmelites.

The abbey was abandoned before 1383 and in 1413 it was transferred by Pope Gregory XII to the Order of Saint Augustine who already had a friary in Ballinrobe. It was burned in 1430 but repaired soon after. It was usurped by the Cromwellians and in 1607 James I granted the land to John King, who sold it to Oliver Bowen in 1608. Later Charles II granted it to John King and then Sir Henry Lynch whose family kept it until the 19th century. It now belongs to the Office of Public Works who restored it in the 1960s.

The current remains are largely of the 15th century.

Building

The lower church has some 13th century niches but much of it was rebuilt in the 15th century when the present windows were inserted.

The rectangular church has a south aisle with a two-arch arcade. It has a traceried east window and a piscina.

The cloister lies to the north of the church but there are no remains of an arcade.

References

External links

Carmelite monasteries in the Republic of Ireland
Augustinian monasteries in the Republic of Ireland
Religion in County Mayo
Archaeological sites in County Mayo
National Monuments in County Mayo